Hombron's kingfisher or the blue-capped kingfisher (Actenoides hombroni) is a species of bird in the family Alcedinidae endemic to the Philippines and found only on Mindanao. It is one of the most colorful kingfishers in the country having a dark blue (green for females) cap and wings with rufous spots, a striped rufous belly, white chin and red bill . Its natural habitats are on the upper ranges of tropical moist lowland forest and  tropical moist montane forests. It is threatened by habitat loss.

Description 

EBird describes the bird as "A spectacular medium-sized kingfisher of foothill and montane forest on Mindanao with a thick red bill, a white throat, a blue rump, and faintly scaled rufous on the underparts and cheek, extending around the back of the neck. The male has a blue crown, blue tail, and blue wings with buff spots. The blue is replaced by green in the female. The male also has an additional blue moustache stripe. Unmistakable. More often seen than heard. Song, given at dawn, consists of a single downslurred whistle with a slightly metallic quality, “wee-ooo,” repeated every few seconds."

These kingfishers exhibit sexual dimorphism in which the males have the eponymous dark blue-cap and dark blue wings. The females on the other hand have aqua-green cap and wings.

Habitat and Conservation Status 
Its natural habitats are on the upper ranges of tropical moist lowland forest and  tropical moist montane forests having a wide altitude range of 100 -2,400 meters above sea level but with majority of records are above 1,000 masl. They are often found close to streams. 

IUCN has assessed this bird as vulnerable with its population estimated at 2,500 to 9,999 mature individuals and thought to still be decreasing. This species' main threat is habitat loss with wholesale clearance of forest habitats as a result of logging, agricultural conversion and mining activities occurring within the range.  This species appears to show a preference for montane habitats which are most at risk from mining activities especially for chromite and nickel. 

It occurs in a few protected areas like Pasonanca Natural Park, Mount Kitanglad National Park, Mount Apo National Park and Mt. Hilong-hilong Watershed but as with most areas in the Philippines protection and enforcement are lax.

References

External links

BirdLife Species Factsheet.

Hombron's kingfisher
Birds of Mindanao
Hombron's kingfisher
Hombron's kingfisher
Taxonomy articles created by Polbot